The Tang thương ngẫu lục (chữ Hán: 桑滄偶錄, Random Record of Great Changes, 1806) is a Chinese-language work by Vietnamese Confucian scholars Phạm Đình Hổ and Nguyễn Án. The work documents religious and social events of 18th-century Vietnam.

References

Vietnamese books
Chinese-language literature of Vietnam
Vietnamese short story collections